Brandon Scott Kozun (born March 8, 1990) is an American-born Canadian professional ice hockey player currently playing with HC Dinamo Minsk of the Kontinental Hockey League (KHL). He was a drafted in the sixth round, 179th overall, in the 2009 NHL Entry Draft by the Los Angeles Kings. He scored his first NHL career goal on February 20, 2015, against the Carolina Hurricanes.

Kozun played junior hockey for the Calgary Hitmen, and won both the Western Hockey League (WHL) and Canadian Hockey League (CHL) scoring titles in 2009–10 as the Hitmen won the WHL championship. Although he was born in the United States, Kozun has represented Canada internationally, as a member of the Canadian junior team that won a silver medal at the 2010 World Junior Ice Hockey Championships.

Personal life
Kozun was born March 8, 1990, in Los Angeles, California. His father, Michael, is American, while his mother, Donna, was born in Canada. He has two elder brothers, Johnathan and Christopher. Following the lead of his brothers, Kozun began playing hockey in 1993 at the age of three; the same time the Los Angeles Kings reached the Stanley Cup Finals for the first time, leading to an increase in popularity for the sport. His first coach was Mike Barnett, the agent of Kings' star Wayne Gretzky. His family moved to Calgary, Alberta, when he was around ten years old. He continued playing, first with the Blackfoot then Midnapore minor ice hockey associations in Calgary before attending Shattuck-Saint Mary's in Faribault, Minnesota, in 2005–06. He played in the 2003 Quebec International Pee-Wee Hockey Tournament with Midnapore.

Playing career

Junior
Kozun began his junior career with the Calgary Royals of the Alberta Junior Hockey League (AJHL) in 2006–07. He also appeared in 11 games with the Calgary Hitmen, scoring one goal. Kozun moved up to the Western Hockey League (WHL) full-time in 2007–08 as he recorded 19 goals and 53 points in 67 games for the Hitmen. He improved to 108 points in 2008–09, second in the League behind Casey Pierro-Zabotel's 115, and was named a First-Team All-Star by the WHL. His season also earned the attention of scouts.

The diminutive forward relies on his speed and skating ability and was praised by Hitmen Head Coach Mike Williamson for his competitive nature and willing to play any role the team asks of him. Williamson added that his sense of anticipation allows Kozun to see plays on the ice develop before they happen, stating it to be a trait found in elite athletes. His small size, standing , initially led WHL teams to overlook him, as well as NHL scouts who argued he was too small for the NHL. He was left unranked by NHL Central Scouting in his first year of draft eligibility in 2008, and went undrafted that year. Following his 108-point season with the Hitmen, the Los Angeles Kings selected Kozun with their sixth-round pick, 179th overall, at the 2009 NHL Entry Draft. Kozun led the WHL in scoring in 2009–10, scoring 13 points in his final five games to finish with 107 points to win the Bob Clarke Trophy.

Professional
The Kings assigned Kozun to their American Hockey League (AHL) affiliate, the Manchester Monarchs, to begin the 2010–11 season.

In his home debut for the Monarchs, on October 16, 2010, against the Providence Bruins, Kozun scored two goals, the first of which was a penalty shot goal at 19:26 of the game's first period. The goal was the first of two penalty shot attempts by the Monarchs, a franchise record for penalty shots awarded in a game.

After four seasons in the Kings organization, Kozun was traded to the Toronto Maple Leafs on January 22, 2014, in exchange for forward Andrew Crescenzi. Kozun was assigned to the AHL's Toronto Marlies. After an impressive display in pre-season Kozun made the final cut for the Maple Leafs for the 2014–15 season. He scored his first NHL point with an assist on a goal by Nazem Kadri in the season opener against the Montreal Canadiens on October 8, 2014. He was later placed on waivers on December 17, 2014. He would remain with the organization, however, and later in the season, on February 20, 2015, Kozun scored his first career NHL goal in his eighth game played.

On June 18, 2015, Kozun left the Maple Leafs to sign a one-year deal with Jokerit of the Kontinental Hockey League. As the League's only Finland-based team, Kozun made an immediate impact with Jokerit in the 2015–16 season. He led the club with 34 assists and 49 points in 58 games to help Jokerit claim the Bobrov Division before suffering a first round defeat to the hands of Torpedo Nizhny Novgorod.

After three seasons with Lokomotiv Yaroslavl, Kozun left as a free agent following the 2018–19 season. He signed a one-year contract to continue in the KHL with Metallurg Magnitogorsk on May 1, 2019.

Kozun enjoyed one season in Magnitogorsk before continuing in the KHL with Belarusian club, HC Dinamo Minsk, on a one-year contract on August 6, 2020.

On July 6, 2021, Kozun joined HC Ambrì-Piotta of the National League (NL) on a one-year deal.

Following a season returned with Lokomotiv Yaroslavl, on June 14, 2022, Kozun transferred as a free agent to sign a one-year contract in returning with Belarusian KHL club, HC Dinamo Minsk.

International play

Kozun earned the attention of both the Canadian and American national junior teams whilst leading the WHL in scoring early in the 2009–10 season. Kozun was reportedly guaranteed a spot on the American team at the 2010 World Junior Ice Hockey Championships, but declined as he wanted to show loyalty to the nation that developed him as a hockey player. He later earned a spot on the Canadian team, his first time representing Hockey Canada internationally. During round robin play, he scored the shootout winner to cap a dramatic 5–4 come from behind victory over the Americans, leading Canada to first place in their pool, and a bye into the semi-final round of the tournament. Canada, however, lost a rematch against the Americans in the gold medal game, also in overtime, to settle for the silver medal.

Kozun was selected to play for Team Canada at the 2018 Winter Olympics where he helped them win a bronze medal.

Career statistics

Regular season and playoffs

International

Awards and honours

References

External links

1990 births
Living people
HC Ambrì-Piotta players
Calgary Hitmen players
Calgary Royals players
Canadian ice hockey right wingers
Canadian people of American descent
HC Dinamo Minsk players
Ice hockey people from Los Angeles
Jokerit players
Lokomotiv Yaroslavl players
Los Angeles Kings draft picks
Manchester Monarchs (AHL) players
Metallurg Magnitogorsk players
Olympic ice hockey players of Canada
Ice hockey players at the 2018 Winter Olympics
Olympic bronze medalists for Canada
Medalists at the 2018 Winter Olympics
Olympic medalists in ice hockey
Ice hockey people from Calgary
Toronto Maple Leafs players
Toronto Marlies players
Canadian expatriate ice hockey players in Finland
Canadian expatriate ice hockey players in Russia